Opinion polling has been regularly conducted in Brazil since the start of Jair Bolsonaro's four-year term administration, gauging public support for the President of Brazil and his government. Typically, an approval rating is based on responses to a poll in which a sample of people are asked to evaluate the overall administration of the current president. Participants might also be asked whether they approve of the way president handles his job, if they trust him, to rate his personality, or to opine on various policies promoted by the government.

Overall administration evaluation 
The public was asked to evaluate the performance of Bolsonaro's administration. A question might ask:
The administration of President Jair Bolsonaro has been excellent, good, regular, bad, or terrible?

Presidential approval ratings 

The public was asked whether they approved or disapproved of the way Jair Bolsonaro governs Brazil.

Public trust in Bolsonaro 

The public was asked whether they trusted Jair Bolsonaro.

Issue-specific support

COVID-19 

The public was asked to evaluate the performance of Jair Bolsonaro in relation to the COVID-19 pandemic. A question might ask:
How do you evaluate the performance of President Jair Bolsonaro in relation to the coronavirus outbreak: excellent, good, regular, bad, or terrible?

Gun control 

Loosening gun control laws was one of Bolsonaro's major campaign promises during the 2018 Brazilian general election. The changes were first signed it into a decree in May. In March 2019, an Ibope survey asked the public whether they approved of the policy and related questions. Polls conducted by Datafolha and Paraná Pesquisas presented similar findings.

Should gun control laws be loosened?

Are you favorable to (any kind of) carry?

Does having a gun at home make it safer?

Does carrying a gun make someone safer?

Does increasing the number of armed people make society safer?

See also 
2018 Brazilian general election
2022 Brazilian general election
Opinion polling for the 2018 Brazilian general election
Opinion polling for the 2022 Brazilian general election
Presidency of Jair Bolsonaro

Notes
a.

References

External links 
News from Brazil's Superior Electoral Court (TSE) 

Jair Bolsonaro
Opinion polling in Brazil